Safar Tamam Howa is a Pakistani drama serial based on the novel of same name by Rahat Jabeen. It telecast on Hum TV from 16 March 2021 to 7 June 2021. It features Madiha Imam, Ali Rehman Khan, Syed Jibran, Samina Ahmad, and Maha Hasan in lead roles. The story revolves around a household where everything changes after an accident.

Summary 

Qudisa is the head of the house where she lives with, her two sons Sami and Jamal, her niece named Rija, brother-in-law Anwar and Anwar's daughter Anoushey. Anoushey and Sami love each other since childhood and want to marry however one day Rija gets murdered. After the sad demise of her, not only their marriage postponds but the lives of the people of the house completely change.

Cast 
 Madiha Imam as Anoushey “Annu”; the hopeful female protagonist and Sami's eventual wife
 Ali Rehman Khan as Sami; male protagonist and Anoushey's eventual husband
 Syed Jibran as Jamal; Sami's elder brother who wants to marry Anoushey
 Maha Hasan as Rija; Sami and Anoushey's mentally challenged cousin
 Samina Ahmed as Qudsia; Sami and Jamal's loving and caring mother who also raises Rija and Anoushey's
 Annie Zaidi as Rafia; Qudsia's sister and Nabeel's mother, runs a boutique
 Haris Waheed as Nabeel; Rafia's son and flirty by nature, shares strong bond with Rija and falls for Ayeza
 Sonia Nazir as Ayeza; Anoushey's bold and confident friend and Nabeel's love interest
 Saife Hassan as Anwar; Anoushey's lazy father who once used to be a Tabla Nawaz (a musician)
 Ayesha Gul as Nazli Begum; former stage actress and Anwar's second wife
 Noreen Gulwani as Nazo; Nazli Begum's daughter, slightly immature and wants to marry someone
 Hamza Sheikh as Nasir; neighbor of Qudsia
 Umer Aalam as Jamal's friend
 Salma Asim as Nazil Begum's friend

Production 
The serial marked comeback of Ali Rehman Khan after her last serial Khaas in 2019. The drama serial is directed by Shehrazade Sheikh who previously directed the Muqaddar which also stars Madiha Imam.

Broadcast
The serial was started to broadcast on 16 March 2021. The series was given the timeslot of Mohabbatein Chahatein, 8:00pm of Tuesday nights, which was shifted to Thursday nights at 8:00pm. However, after the end of Dulhan, serial started airing on Monday and Tuesday nights at 8:00 PM.

References

Pakistani drama television series
2021 Pakistani television series debuts
Urdu-language television shows
Hum TV
Hum Network Limited
Hum TV original programming